Robert David Stevens (born 1965) is a professor of bio-health informatics. and former Head of Department of Computer Science at The University of Manchester

Education
Stevens gained his Bachelor of Science degree in biochemistry from the University of Bristol in 1986, a Master of Science degree in bioinformatics in 1991 and a DPhil in Computer Science in 1996, both from the University of York.

Career and research
Stevens current research interests are the construction of biological ontologies, such as the Gene Ontology, and the reconciliation of semantic heterogeneity in bioinformatics. This research has been funded by the Engineering and Physical Sciences Research Council (EPSRC), Biotechnology and Biological Sciences Research Council (BBSRC) and the European Union.

Stevens has been Principal investigator for a range of research projects including Ondex, ComparaGrid, SWAT (Semantic Web Authoring Tool) and the Ontogenesis Network.

Stevens served as Program Chair and co-organiser for the International Conference on Biomedical Ontology (ICBO) 2012 and co-founded the UK Ontology Network. He has also participated in the Health care and Life Sciences Interest Group (HCLSIG) of the World Wide Web Consortium (W3C). Stevens is currently on the editorial board of the Journal of Biomedical Semantics. Stevens started as a lecturer, then became a senior lecturer, Reader and became a Professor in August 2013.

Stevens has taught on several undergraduate and postgraduate courses on software engineering, databases, bioinformatics and runs introductory and advanced courses on the Web Ontology Language. He has been the main doctoral advisor to five successful PhD students and co-supervised several others.

Since July 2016 he has served as Head of Department of Computer Science at The University of Manchester.

References

|-

Alumni of the University of York
Alumni of the University of Bristol
Academics of the University of Manchester
People associated with the Department of Computer Science, University of Manchester
Living people
1965 births